Calvin Goddard may refer to:

Calvin Hooker Goddard (1891–1955), forensic expert and ballistics pioneer
Calvin Goddard (politician) (1768–1842), United States Representative from Connecticut

See also
Calvin G. Child (Calvin Goddard Child, 1834–1880), judge and US attorney, grandson of the politician